JUTH FC was a Nigerian football club from Jos playing in the Nigeria National League.

History
They played at the Rwang Pam Stadium, with a capacity of 15 000. Due to the 2010 Jos riots they played some home games in Lafia, Nasarawa.

After avoiding relegation from the Nigeria National League in 2013, they announced their disbandment for lack of funds. Their last record was 10 wins, 5 draws and 13 losses.

References

Football clubs in Nigeria
Jos
Plateau State
Association football clubs established in 1989
Association football clubs disestablished in 2013
Sports clubs in Nigeria
Defunct football clubs in Nigeria
Works association football clubs in Nigeria